Goodbye, Franziska is a 1941 German romance film directed by Helmut Käutner and starring Marianne Hoppe, Hans Söhnker and Fritz Odemar. It portrays the relationship between a globetrotting reporter and his devoted wife. The film was remade in 1957.

After World War II, the Allied Forces banned the film from being shown in the German-occupied area because of its ending, which reminded the viewers to support the war effort. Director Käutner was eventually able to convince officials that the propaganda sequence was in no way a reflection of his political ideology and was added at request of Nazi censors. The remainder of the film was fairly apolitical, and, as such, it was brought back in circulation a few years later; the propaganda end sequence is not seen on current prints of the film.

It was shot at the Tempelhof Studios.

Synopsis
Reisiger travels over the world, in search of news stories.  He meets and marries Franziska, after her pregnancy, but continues to leave her.  One colleague, dying, tells him to go home, and he returns.  When World War II breaks out, he  must leave again for war, and Franziska waits for him.

Cast

 Marianne Hoppe as Franziska Tiemann
 Hans Söhnker as Michael Reisiger
 Fritz Odemar as Professor Tiemann
 Rudolf Fernau as Dr. Christoph Leitner
 Hermann Speelmans as Buck Standing
 Margot Hielscher as Helen Philips
 Herbert Hübner as Ted Simmons
 Frida Richard as Kathrin
 Klaus Pohl as Briefträger Pröckl
 Elmer Bantz as Der junge Begleiter von Helen Philips
 Traute Baumbach as Das mollige Animiermädchen in Seaman's Paradiese
 Louis Brody as Der Portier im südamerikanischen Hotel
 Josefine Dora as Frau Schöpf
 Angelo Ferrari as Gast im Seaman's Paradise
 Ursula Herking as Nettie
 Karl Jüstel as Gast im Seaman's Paradise
 Rudolf Kalvius as Ein Anwalt
 Gustl Kreusch as Animierdame
 Evelyn Künneke as Singer'Sing Nachtigall Sing'
 Renate Mannhardt as Die exotische Tänzerin
 Vera Mayr as Krankenschwester
 Annemarie Schäfer as Das melancholische Mädchen
 Marianne Stanior as Das Animiermädchen mit Michael
 Hans Wallner as Der Ober im Ratscafe
 Erich Ziegel as Arzt
 Ernö René
 Ruth Kruse
 Edith Hildebrandt
 Beryl Roberts
 Marianne Beckmann

References

Bibliography 
 Hake, Sabine. Popular Cinema of the Third Reich. University of Texas Press, 2001.

External links 
 

1941 films
Films of Nazi Germany
German romance films
German black-and-white films
1941 romance films
1940s German-language films
Films directed by Helmut Käutner
Films about journalists
Terra Film films
Films shot at Tempelhof Studios
1940s German films